Umzinto is a town, located in the South Coast of KwaZulu-Natal, South Africa and falls under the uMdoni Local Municipality. It was a sugarcane growing area and the town was set up as the centre for a sugar mill.

Etymology 
"Umzinto" is said to be derived from the Zulu "umenzi wezinto", meaning "the kraal [or place] of accomplishment".

According to an urban legend, the town's name derived from a visit by two men, one of whom was named Um. On encountering a stream, the men decided to cross it, but Um did not notice the crocodile lurking beneath the surface. Subsequently, Um was attacked by the crocodile, and bitten in half. "Um's in two!" his friend exclaimed. The legend has been ascribed to Jonathan Swift but Swift died in 1745, decades before the British encountered the region.

History 
The first public company in Natal was established at Umzinto on the 6 July 1846. The sugar cane fields on the outskirts of Umzinto are owned and run by Crookes Brothers, a JSE listed company. Umzinto was named the last town in Durban in 1963.

Economy 
Today, Umzinto remains an urban town, with not much progress. This is due to the Group Areas Act of the previous Apartheid era.  It was once the home of three large textile mills, namely Alitex, Bally Spinning Mills and MYM Textiles that used to export abroad. Today only one survives and is not as productive as it used to be. Consequently, this has affected the economy of Umzinto negatively.

Sport 
Unofficially, Umzinto was at one time the capital of Alexandra County, a district that also includes the areas and suburbs surrounding the towns of Scottburgh, Umkomaas, and Sezela-Pennington.  Umzinto hosted two class-A cricket matches at the Alexandra Memorial Ground, one on 2 March  1974, when Natal B hosted Griqualand West in the Currie Cup Section B, and again on 19 March 1977, when Natal B faced Border in the same contest.

Law and government 
The municipality has not maintained the roads and currently the roads are in a deplorable condition.  In 1995, low cost housing was developed on the outskirts called Gandhi Nagar.

Education 
Schools: Umzintovale Primary School, Umzinto Secondary School, Umzinto Islamic School, St Patrick's Primary School, Roseville Secondary School, St Annes Primary School

Umzinto also houses a Darul-Uloom called Madrassa Da'watul Haq that has produced many graduates who have memorised the entire Quraan.

Halls: Sanathan Hall, Islamic Cultural Centre, Umzinto Town Hall

Media 
Radio Station : Life FM KZN

Infrastructure

Railways 
Until halfway through the 1980s, Umzinto was the southern terminus of the Umzinto - Donnybrook narrow gauge railway and had transshipment facilities to a Cape gauge branch line to Kelso, along the railway to Johannesburg

Notable residents
Bavelile Hlongwa (1981–2019), South African politician and chemical engineer. 
 Sadanund Ramjee Dhaja (captain) a police officer who served with decorum and integrity and received accolades for highest arrests in the prevention of crime (1997).

References 

Populated places in the Umdoni Local Municipality
KwaZulu-Natal South Coast